Mallabhum (The Country originally known as Mallabhoom or Mallabani  or Bishnupur kingdom ) was the kingdom ruled by the Malla kings of Bishnupur, primarily in the present Bankura district in Indian state of West Bengal.

History

Territory of the Mallabhum 
It is told that Mallabhum is the territory, which included Bankura, a part of Burdwan, Birbhum, Santhal Parganas, Midnapur and also a part of Purulia. The Malla Rajas ruled over the vast territory in the south-western part of present West Bengal and a part of southeastern Jharkhand.

Extent

The area around Bishnupur and Bankura was called Mallabhum. The core area would cover present day Bankura police station area (excluding Chhatna), Onda, Bishnupur, Kotulpur and Indas. In olden days the term was used for a much larger area, which probably was the furthest extent of the Bishnupur kingdom. In the north it stretched from Damin-i-koh in Santhal Parganas to Midnapore in the south. It included the eastern part of Bardhaman and included parts of Chota Nagpur in the west.

According to O'Malley, the Rajas of Bishnupur were also known as Malla kings. Malla is a Sanskrit word meaning wrestler but there could be some links with the Mal tribes of the area, who had intimate connection with the Bagdis.

From around 7th century CE till around the advent of British rule, for around a millennium, history of Bankura district is identical with the rise and fall of the Hindu Rajas of Bishnupur. The legends of Bipodtarini Devi are associated with Malla Kings of Bishnupur.

Administration

Taxation of Mallabhum
According to Bhattacharjee, Tarun Dev (1982) during Malla period, the society was centred round the village. The tax collectors were called as Gumasta and their assistants as Aat Pahari or Paik The Mukhiya or Mandal was the title of headman, who was regarded as the 
guardian of the village. Malla kings had several service groups. Due to scarcity of money, the Malla kings used to present land instead of salary to all these service groups. This type of land is again of two types – namely the Panchaki jamin or land with a little tax and another one is the Bepanchaki jamin or land without any tax. Again the lands were named as per the service groups name as Senapati mahal for the head of the soldier, land given to the sentry was Mahalbera Mahal, and land given to the bodyguard was Chharidar Mahal.

Malla calendar
Malla's started their own calendar that is Malla era (Mallabda). It is told that Malla era started from Indra Dwadasi day in the year 102 Bengali calendar of the month Bhadro (August- September).

Mallabhum temples

According to Dr. Bloch, Superintendent of the Archaeological Survey of India, Eastern Circle, the twelve date temples range 
in chronological order as follows:

Notable
Bishnupur is famous for its terracotta craft, Baluchari Sari and Mallabhum Sari made of Tassar silk and was for almost a thousand years the capital of the Malla kings of Mallabhum.

Reservoir
Bir Singha Dev also had the seven big lakes or tanks, called Lalbandh, Krishnabandh, Gantatbandh, Jamunabandh, Kalindibandh, Shyambandh, and pokabandh excavated, and erected.

Gallery

References

Sources

Further reading

 
Bankura district
States and territories established in the 690s
States and territories established in the 7th century
Dynasties of Bengal